St Austell Gover is an electoral division of Cornwall in the United Kingdom and returns one member to sit on Cornwall Council. The current Councillor is Sandra Heyward, an Independent.

Extent
St Austell Gover covers the west side of St Austell and most of the town centre (some of which is covered by the Mount Charles division). The division covers 152 hectares in total.

Election results

2017 election

2013 election

2009 election

References

Electoral divisions of Cornwall Council
St Austell